Bond, Schoeneck & King, PLLC is a law firm headquartered in Syracuse, New York.  As of 2020, it was the 182nd largest law firm in the United States by number of lawyers.

History

Bond, Schoeneck & King was founded in 1897 in Syracuse, New York, the year that George H. Bond graduated from Syracuse University College of Law and began his career. His practice grew rapidly in downtown Syracuse, and in 1908 he was joined by Edward Schoeneck. Clarence R. King joined them in 1913, and soon thereafter, “Bond, Schoeneck & King” became the unchanging name of the firm.

From the three named founders, Bond, Schoeneck & King has grown to a law firm of 250 attorneys with eleven offices in five states, New York, Florida, Kansas, New Jersey and Massachusetts. The firm comprises 25 practice areas and 10 industry groups, that include among others Employee Benefits and Executive Compensation, Environmental and Energy, Intellectual Property and Technology, Labor and Employment Law, Mergers and Acquisitions, Agribusiness, Exempt Organizations, Higher Education, Collegiate Sports and Real Estate Development and Construction.

Representative Clients

 Allergan
 Allied Motion Technologies
 ASM Global
 Bank of America
 Baylor University
 CABLExpress
 Car-Freshner
 Churchill School and Center
 College of Mount Saint Vincent
 Collier Mosquito Control District
 Ellis Hospital
 Fastrac Markets
 Gateway School of New York
 IMS, Inc.
 Mohawk Valley Health System
 Naples Airport Authority
 Odd Fellow & Rebekah Benefit Fund
 Oneida County Local Development Corporation
 Paychex
 PMA Management
 Poughkeepsie City School District
 Revere Copper Products
 Rochester Institute of Technology
 Rochester Regional Health
 Seneca Foods
 State-Wide Schools Cooperative Health Plan
 Syracuse City School District
 The Alcott School
 Try-It Distributing
 Villa Veritas Foundation
 Village of Hempstead
 William Floyd School District

References

Law firms based in New York (state)
Companies based in Syracuse, New York
Law firms established in 1897